The Haviland Crater, also called the Brenham Crater, is a meteorite crater (astrobleme) in Kiowa County, Kansas.

The oval crater is 50 feet (roughly 15 meters) in diameter, making it one of the smallest impact craters in the world. Its age is estimated to be less than 1000 years.  It has been explored with ground-penetrating radar.

Meteorite

Over 15,000 pounds (7,000 kilograms) of pallasite meteorites have been recovered from the Brenham fall.

References

Impact craters of the United States
Landforms of Kansas
Holocene impact craters
Landforms of Kiowa County, Kansas